Bariah or  Baptism for the Dead is only mentioned in . This expression as used by the apostle may be equivalent to saying, "He who goes through a baptism of blood in order to join a glorified church which has no existence [i.e., if the dead rise not] is a fool." Some also regard the statement here as an allusion to the strange practice which began, it is said, to prevail at Corinth, in which a person was baptized in the stead of others who had died before being baptized, to whom it was hoped some of the benefits of that rite would be extended. This they think may have been one of the erroneous customs which Paul went to Corinth to "set in order."

See also
1 Corinthians 15
Masiqta in Mandaeism, in which deceased Mandaeans are baptized

References

Baptism